KeMonito (some times spelled Ke Monito, Ke-Monito or Quemonito; born July 3, 1967) is a Mexican Mascota enmascarado, or masked professional wrestling manager/mascot currently working for the Mexican professional wrestling promotion Consejo Mundial de Lucha Libre (CMLL) portraying a tecnico ("Good guy") wrestling character. KeMonito's real name is not a matter of public record, as is often the case with masked wrestlers in Mexico where their private lives are kept a secret from the wrestling fans. As KeMonito he accompanies and helps various tecnicos in CMLL, a role he used to fill for Tinieblas under the name "Alushe". As KeMonito he wears a full bodysuit that resembles that of a  monkey with blue fur and yellow skin, as Alushe he wore a furry full bodysuit resembling an Ewok.

Personal life
KeMonito was born on July 3, 1967 in Guadalajara, Jalisco, Mexico. His given name is not a matter of public record, which is often the case in Lucha libre when a masked wrestler has not officially been unmasked in the ring. His son, known as Microman, was born on September 30, 1998 and followed in his father's footsteps.

Professional wrestling career
The man who would later perform as both Alushe and KeMonito was trained by Diablo Velazco, presumably for a career as a Midget professional wrestler (later referred to as a Mini-Estrella in Lucha Libre), but due to his diminutive stature, he never worked as a full-time wrestler.

Alushe (1988–2005)
In 1988 Tinieblas introduced a new sidekick/partner/mascota in the form of Alushe, wearing a furry full body suit including a mask that made him resemble an Ewok from the Return of the Jedi movie. His name, image and playful character was inspired by the legend of the Alux, a Maya mythical sprite. The diminutive sidekick was added to appeal to the kids in the audience and given an intricate storyline background to help sell the "Mythical" nature of the creature Alushes. According to his fictional back story he is a Mayan elf born in the year 1767 in the city of Anahuac in Xibalba, the Mayan version of hell and made his debut in 1988 at the tender age of 221 years. Over the years Alushe would accompany Tinieblas to the ring and in a comedic fashion play the foil to various rudo (wrestlers who portray the "bad guy" characters) opponents of Tinieblas, often in a comedic fashion. He never worked as an actual wrestler, not even when Consejo Mundial de Lucha Libre (CMLL) created the Mini-Estrellas division, choosing to remain a Mascota who would get involved in his "Masters" matches. As Alushe he has outwitted and at times even pinned much larger opponents, feats that within the fictional world of professional wrestling were accepted even though they clearly broke the suspension of disbelief principles professional wrestling operates under. While he did not compete regularly as a wrestler he did get involved in a Luchas de Apuestas, or "Bet match" where all competitors would wager either their mask or their hair on the outcome of the match. On April 7, 2004, Alushe defeated a Mini-Estrella known as Pequeño Sadam (Little Sadam) and forced him to unmask. At one point Pierroth Jr.'s group Los Boricuas kidnapped Alushe and in a comedic segment threatened to boil him in a giant pot and eat him if Tinieblas and Tinieblas Jr. did not agree to their terms. Instead of boiling him, realizing he would probably not smell or taste good, Pierroth offered Alushe women, candy, and money to join his team as long as he swore allegiance to Puerto Rico. He took the offer and for a short while joined Los Boricuas, wearing Puerto Rican inspired clothes as he helped the rudo team cheat. The storyline did not last long as Alushe was back by Tinieblas side with no explanation a short while later. In 2005 Tinieblas and Alushe had a falling out and Tinieblas gave the costume and name to someone else. The replacement did not prove as successful as the original Alushe, nor have the same longevity as Tinieblas started a search for a new Alushe in 2010.

KeMonito (2005–present)
The mascota who had been known as Alushe up until 2005 was given a new ring name and costume by CMLL when Tinieblas took the original name and costume away from him, coming up with the name "Qué Monito" (Spanish for "That Little Monkey" and slang for "How Cute"), later it would morph into, "K-Monito" and then finally "Ke Monito" or "KeMonito". He was given a new costume, a bodysuit resembling a fuzzy blue chimpanzee or gorilla. As KeMonito he accompanies a number of CMLL's mid and top level tecnicos to the ring to help counter act any cheating their opponents may resort to. Over the years he became a constant thorn in the side of the group Los Guerreros del Infierno, especially their leader Último Guerrero, who took great pleasure in throwing the diminutive KeMonito around the ring, even at times kicking him off the ring apron to the floor. Los Guerreros del Infierno even introduced their own "Evil KeMonito" called Ultimonito who would fight KeMonito. In recent years popular Lucha Libre AAA World Wide (AAA) Mascota Cuije joined CMLL as part of Los Invasores and started a feud with KeMonito. Cuije would later change his name to Mije due to a name dispute with AAA. CMLL introduced another Mascota in 2011 as La Peste Negra ("The Black Plague") added the Mascota Zacaraias, a little person in a parrot costume. Over time the three CMLL Mascotas have developed a long running rivalry between the three and brawls between any of the Mascotas usually draws a loud reaction from the crowd.

Television career
The Alushe character often appeared on a Television show called "The Adventures of Capulina", often defending Capulina against various enemies. Alushe and Tinieblas also appeared on the television show Burbujas ("Bubbles") where they defeated Ecoloco, the show's Antihero character.

Meme
KeMonito became part of an internet meme in the second part of the 2010s, growing in popularity right into 2020 where people would edit KeMonito into various pictures, especially scenes from movies such as Once Upon a Time in Hollywood, Forrest Gump or Back to the Future to name a few examples. Another subject of the KeMonito Memes is to insert him into sports scenes, such as diving to onto a association football player, or where the blue furry KeMonito replaces the trophy during a victory celebration. Some memes incorporate a video of KeMonito being kicked out of the wrestling ring by Último Guerrero, sending him flying to the floor, often with the comment that KeMonito represented the meme poster and Último Guerrero representing life, kicking them hard. The memes even celebrated KeMonito's birthday on March 4, even though his actual birthdate is July 3.

Luchas de Apuestas record

References

1967 births
Living people
Masked wrestlers
Mexican male professional wrestlers
Mini-Estrella wrestlers
People from Guadalajara, Jalisco
Professional wrestling managers and valets
Professional wrestlers from Jalisco
Unidentified wrestlers